UFP is an abbreviation that has several meanings:

 Ultrafine particle, a particulate matter of nanoscale size (less than 100 nanometres in diameter)
 Union des forces progressistes, a former Canadian left-wing political party of Quebec
 Union of Forces of Progress, a former political party in Benin
 Union of the Forces of Progress (Union des Forces du Progrès), a political party in Mauritania
 United Federal Party, a former political party of Southern Rhodesia from 1934 to 1965
 United Federation of Planets, of the fictional Star Trek universe.
 University Foundation Programme, a one-year intensive course that leads to entry to a wide range of universities in the United Kingdom
 United Future Party, a South Korean conservative political party.